Mill Inlet is an ice-filled inlet which recedes  in a northwesterly direction and is some  wide at its entrance between Cape Robinson and Monnier Point, along the east coast of Graham Land, Antarctica. It was charted by the Falkland Islands Dependencies Survey in 1947 and named for Hugh Robert Mill. It was photographed from the air during 1947 by the Ronne Antarctic Research Expedition under Finn Ronne.

See also
Aagaard Glacier, flows in a southerly direction into Mill Inlet

References

Inlets of Graham Land
Foyn Coast